Thassilo Haun (born 21 November 1973) is a retired German tennis player.

Haun has a career high ATP singles ranking of 582 achieved on 26 August 1996. He also has a career high ATP doubles ranking of 851 achieved on 11 November 1996.

Haun made his ATP main draw debut at the 2011 Austrian Open Kitzbühel in the doubles draw partnering Stefan Koubek.

References

External links

1973 births
Living people
German male tennis players
Sportspeople from Saarbrücken